Collegium Musicum de Caracas was a Venezuelan musical group (1964–1976), founded by Evencio Castellanos. Its works include:
Ballet miniatura, of Blanca Estrella de Méscoli, winner of the 1965 National Prize for Music.
Sinfonieta Satírica of Inocente Carreño.

Group members in 1965 
Musical director: Gonzalo Castellanos Yumar
Flute: Juan Durán
Oboe: Julian Oliva
Clarinet: Aurelio Berardi
Bassoon: Heinz K. Tesch
Horn: Cesare Esposito
Harp: Cecilia de Majo
Piano: Adriana Moraga
Violin number 1: Mario Mescoli
Violin number 2: Gianfranco Farina
Viola: Siro Rabitti
Violoncello: Enrico Marcelli
Double bass: Omar Sansone

Sources 
 Information from the album: Collegium Musicum de Caracas, Premio Nacional de Música 1965

See also 
Venezuela
Venezuelan music

Venezuelan musical groups
Musical groups established in 1964
1964 establishments in Venezuela
Musical groups disestablished in 1976
1976 disestablishments in Venezuela